West End High School is a secondary school situated in Azimpur, Dhaka. It was established in 1920 by the time Dhaka University was established. It was the most western side school of Dhaka city back 1920. According to the location, this institute got its name.

The School building has three two storeys and 
Two three storeys. 

Room and size Number of rooms - 46
Area - 4804 sqm

Library
1, Vishnucharan Library

5  Science Laboratories (Physics, Chemistry, Biology, Agriculture, Computer)

Teachers are regular - 55 with 17 employees. 

Morning Branch - (Boys and girls from children to 5th class
Girls from 6th class to 10th class) 

Day Branch - Boys from 6th class to 10th class

(Activities of girls branch started from 2000)

Notable people 
Abdul Hoque, former teacher
 Ahmed Imtiaz Bulbul, musician
 Mahmudul Haque, writer
 Shahid Saber, writer

References

Schools in Dhaka District
1920 establishments in British India
Educational institutions established in 1920